Blaze of Glory is the third album by heavy metal band Jack Starr's Burning Starr. It was released in 1987 by U.S. Metal Records.

Track listing

Personnel
Mike Tirelli – vocals
Jack Starr – guitar
William Fairchild – bass
Jim Harris – drums
Ed Spahn - keyboards
Joe Chinnici - harmony guitars

References 

1987 albums